Modular Function Deployment (MFD) is a method for creating modular product architectures, based on research performed at KTH Royal Institute of Technology in the 1990s. As a result of said research, the company Modular Management was registered in 1996, offering consultancy services centered on the MFD method.

With a modular product architecture, companies can offer a wide range of products and services without increasing complexity, since modules and module variants, like blocks of LEGO, can be configured in many different ways. The MFD method ensures that each module has functional, strategic and customer-centric value and can be combined with other modules through standardized interfaces. A modular product architecture can enable mass customization, where customers configure and order personalized - rather than ready-made - products and services.

Five Steps
MFD consists of five steps and is often illustrated as a circle to emphasize that it is an iterative process.
Clarify Customer Needs
Identify Functions and Solutions
Propose Modules and Interfaces
Define Variants and Configurations
Confirm Architecture Feasibility

References 

 Gunnar Erixon: "Modular Function Deployment – A Method for Product Modularisation", Ph.D. Thesis , The Royal Institute of Technology, Stockholm, 1998. TRITA-MSM R-98-1, ISSN 1104-2141, ISRN KTH/MSM/R-98/1-SE.
 Application of the Modular Function Deployment Tool on a pressure regulator, Gilles Clemen / Rotarex Automotive S.A., Lintgen/Luxembourg

External links
 Modular Function Deployment

Function deployment
Product development
Systems engineering